John Brennan (13 December 1892 – 13 August 1942) was an English professional footballer who played as a half back. He made 88 appearances in the Football League without scoring.

Career
Born in Manchester, Brennan played for Ancoats Lads Club, Hollinwood United, Denton, Glossop, Bradford City, Manchester City and Rochdale. For Bradford City, he made 11 appearances in the Football League. For Manchester City, he made 56 appearances in the Football League, and 4 appearances in the FA Cup. Brennan was also part of Great Britain's squad for the 1920 Summer Olympics, but he did not play in any matches.

Sources

References

1892 births
1942 deaths
Footballers from Manchester
English footballers
Glossop North End A.F.C. players
Bradford City A.F.C. players
Manchester City F.C. players
Rochdale A.F.C. players
English Football League players
Association football defenders
Place of death missing